Pacific City may refer to:

Pacific City, Oregon, USA; an unincorporated community
 Pacific City State Airport
Pacific City, Washington, USA; a ghost town
Pacific City Amusement Park, which was open briefly (1922–24) in what is now Coyote Point Recreation Area, a county park in San Mateo County, California

See also

Huntington Beach, California, USA; formerly known as Pacific City
Pacific, Washington, USA; a city in King and Pierce counties

Pacific, Missouri, USA; a city in Franklin county
Pacific City Bank, a community bank in California
Pacific City Lines, a U.S. streetcar company designed to phase out trolleys for motorbuses
Core Pacific City, a shopping mall in Taipei, Taiwan
City Pacific, an Australian financial services company
City Pacific Finance Stakes, an Australian horse race
 
 Pacific (disambiguation)